Copernicus is a lunar impact crater located in eastern Oceanus Procellarum. It was named after the astronomer Nicolaus Copernicus. It typifies craters that formed during the Copernican period in that it has a prominent ray system.
It may have been created by debris from the breakup of the parent body of asteroid 495 Eulalia 800 million years ago.

Characteristics

Copernicus is visible using binoculars, and is located slightly northwest of the center of the Moon's Earth-facing hemisphere. South of the crater is the Mare Insularum, and to the south-south west is the crater Reinhold. North of Copernicus are the Montes Carpatus, which lie at the south edge of Mare Imbrium. West of Copernicus is a group of dispersed lunar hills. Due to its relative youth, the crater has remained in a relatively pristine shape since it formed.

The circular rim has a discernible hexagonal form, with a terraced inner wall and a 30 km wide, sloping rampart that descends nearly a kilometer to the surrounding mare. There are three distinct terraces visible, and arc-shaped landslides due to slumping of the inner wall as the crater debris subsided.

Most likely due to its recent formation, the crater floor has not been flooded by lava. The terrain along the bottom is hilly in the southern half while the north is relatively smooth. The central peaks consist of three isolated mountainous rises climbing as high as 1.2 km above the floor. These peaks are separated from each other by valleys, and they form a rough line along an east–west axis. Infrared observations of these peaks during the 1980s determined that they were primarily composed of the mafic form of olivine.

Based on high-resolution images from Lunar Orbiter 5, Terry W. Offield of the U.S. Geological Survey described the crater as having,

The crater rays spread as far as 800 kilometers across the surrounding mare, overlying rays from the craters Aristarchus and Kepler. The rays are less distinct than the long, linear rays extending from Tycho, instead forming a nebulous pattern with plumy markings. In multiple locations the rays lie at glancing angles, instead of forming a true radial dispersal. An extensive pattern of smaller secondary craters can also be observed surrounding Copernicus, a detail that was depicted in a map by Giovanni Cassini in 1680. Some of these secondary craters form sinuous chains in the ejecta.

In 1966 the crater was photographed from an oblique angle by Lunar Orbiter 2 as one of 12 "housekeeping" pictures that were taken to advance the roll of film between possible astronaut landing sites being surveyed. At the time this detailed image of the lunar surface was termed by NASA scientist Martin Swetnick and subsequently quoted by Time magazine as "one of the great pictures of the century."

The Apollo 12 mission landed south of Copernicus on mare basalts of Oceanus Procellarum that were believed to have been in the path of one of the crater's rays, and scientists hoped cosmic ray exposure ages of soil samples would help constrain the crater age. The results were inconclusive, but not inconsistent with the estimated 800 million year age of crater formation. Copernicus itself was a possible landing site for the canceled Apollo 20 mission.

Names 

Copernicus is named after the astronomer Nicolaus Copernicus. Like many of the craters on the Moon's near side, it was given its name by Giovanni Riccioli, whose 1651 nomenclature system has become standardized. Riccioli awarded Copernicus a prominent crater despite the fact that, as an Italian Jesuit, he conformed with church doctrine in publicly opposing Copernicus's heliocentric system.  Riccioli justified the name by noting that he had symbolically thrown all the heliocentrist astronomers into the Ocean of Storms. However, astronomical historian Ewan Whitaker suspects that the prominence of Copernicus crater is a sign that Riccioli secretly supported the heliocentric system and was ensuring that Nicolaus Copernicus would receive a worthy legacy for future generations.

Earlier lunar cartographers had given the feature different names. Pierre Gassendi named it Carthusia after the Chartreuse Mountains. Michael van Langren's 1645 map calls it "Phillipi IV" after Philip IV of Spain. And Johannes Hevelius named it 'Etna M.' after Mount Etna.

Later the crater was nicknamed "the Monarch of the Moon" by lunar cartographer Thomas Gwyn Elger.

Satellite craters 

By convention these features are identified on lunar maps by placing the letter on the side of the crater midpoint that is closest to Copernicus.

Copernicus H, a typical "dark-halo" crater, was a target of observation by Lunar Orbiter 5 in 1967.  Dark-halo craters were once believed to be volcanic in origin rather than the result of impacts. The Orbiter image showed that the crater had blocks of ejecta like other craters of similar size, indicating an impact origin.  The halo results from excavation of darker material (mare basalt) at depth.

See also 
 1322 Coppernicus, asteroid
 List of craters on the Moon
 List of people with craters of the Moon named after them
 Lunar geologic timescale

References

Further reading

External links 

 Copernicus at The Moon Wiki
 Eight high-resolution images of Copernicus by Lunar Orbiter 5: V-150, V-151, V-152, V-153, V-154, V-155, V-156, V-157
 Dark Wisps in Copernicus - Lunar Reconnaissance Orbiter pages with images
 High resolution video by Seán Doran of an overflight of Copernicus, based on LRO data (see album for more)
 Copernicus crater from Apollo 17

Related articles 
 
 
 
 
 
 
 
 
  - repeat of the February 13, 2004 LPOD
 
 
  - the bright ray-craterlet immediately west of Copernicus.
 
 
 

Impact craters on the Moon